Sprot (or Sprott or Sprotte) is a family name. Notable people with the name include:
 Adrian Sprott, Scottish footballer
 Sir Alexander Sprot, 1st Baronet
 Sprot Baronets
 Bert Sprotte, German actor
Cecilia Sprot, British viscountess
 Charles B. Sprott, Canadian former professional wrestler, known as Ricky Hunter
 Clint Sprott, professor of physics
 George Sprott, graphic novel
 George Washington Sprott, Scottish liturgical scholar
 Hemel Sprot, imaginary animal
 Michael Sprott, boxer
 Thomas Sprott, monk and chronicler
 Thomas Sprott or Thomas Spratt, martyr
 Thomas Sprott, bishop
 William S. Pollitzer, anatomist
 Eric Sprott, Canadian billionaire, Sprott School of Business

See also
Sprot (disambiguation)
Spratt (surname)

fr:Sprot